The Gospel of Afranius is a 1995 counterapologetic polemic by Russian writer Kirill Eskov. Its illustrative novel part is a dramatic portrayal of Jesus. In this work, Eskov constructs a demythologised account of the events of the Gospels.

A free online English version, endorsed by Eskov, appeared in December 2022.

Publication history 
As described by Eskov, earnest attempts of his religious close friend, a musician and poet, to convert him led him to creation of this book as a response.

Eskov self-published this work in 1995 after several Russian book publishers turned him down, as they feared the book could spark a controversy and draw the ire of the resurgent Russian Orthodox Church. As of 2020, it has received five subsequent editions in Russian by regular publishers (2001 by ACT, 2003 by Фолио, 2005 by ЭНАС, 2016 by Алькор Паблишерс and 2019 by Престиж Бук); the latter three are anthologies combing it with several other works by Eskov. In 2003 it was also translated to Polish (and published by Solaris).

Structure and plot 
The book is divided into two parts. The first part is a non-fiction essay and polemic in which the author, a Russian biologist, challenges the claims made by Josh McDowell, an American evangelical apologist and evangelist, in his book The Resurrection Factor (1981). McDowell's book argues that events portrayed in the New Testament, specifically, the resurrection of Jesus, cannot be explained without miracles and have to be seen as a proof of the direct intervention of God. Eskov took McDowell's book as a challenge and decided to publish his own in response.  In this part of the book, he engages with a number of McDowell's arguments.

The second part of the book is a novel and a dramatic portrayal of Jesus, through a story of Afranius (a character from Mikhail Bulgakov's Master and Margarita), in the novel said to be the head of Pontius Pilate's secret service, and his successful manipulation of Jesus Christ and the apostles. The Romans are concerned with the violent opposition to their rule from the factions associated with the religion of Judaism, and design a plan (Operation Ichthys) to create a new, more pacifist religion that would weaken the Judaism faction while being less antagonistic to the Roman rule. For that purpose they chose a new sect organized around Jesus Christ as the most suitable to their goals, and infiltrate it with an undercover operative (Judas). Meantime, John the Baptist, seen as a competitor to Jesus, is executed. The Roman plot culminates with the Roman agents staging two fake resurrections (first of Lazarus of Bethany, second of Jesus). The plan succeeds at discrediting the rabbinical court (Sanhedrin) and deceiving the apostles who became convinced they witnessed a series of supernatural miracles, while in fact what they have seen were staged events orchestrated by paid performers and Roman agents.

The story is Eskov's illustration of his preceding essay's positions, arguing that all the events as portrayed in the New Testament, and corroborated by known archeological and historical evidence, could be explained without the need for a supernatural intervention.

Reception 
In 1997, the book won the Grand Prix at the Festival of Science Fiction Authors in Odessa (Fancon, Фанкон).

Reviewing this work for Nature in 1998, Mikhail Mina noted that it is an expression of Soviet era state atheism clashing with post-Soviet resurgence of religious belief. He observes that it is both a pleasant read (with "humour [that] is sometimes biting, but never insulting") and a successful counter to McDowell, noting that it would likely "find many interested readers if it were published in English".

See also 
Historicity of Jesus
Jonathan Kirsch
Live from Golgotha: The Gospel According to Gore Vidal

References 

1995 Russian novels
Historicity and origin of the Resurrection of Jesus
Depictions of Jesus in literature
Historical mystery novels
Novels set in ancient Rome
Self-published books
Russian spy novels
Secret histories
Novels based on the Bible